Imbricaria ruberorbis is a species of sea snail, a marine gastropod mollusc in the family Mitridae.

Description
The length of the shell varies betrween 14 mm and 30 mm.

Original description
(of Subcancilla ruberorbis Dekkers, Herrmann, Poppe & Tagaro, 2014) Dekkers A.M., Herrmann M., Poppe G.T. & Tagaro S.P. (2014) Three new species of Subcancilla from the Pacific Ocean (Gastropoda: Mitridae). Visaya 4(2): 39-48. [May 2014]
page(s): 40

Distribution
This marine species occurs off the Philippines.

References

External links
 Worms Link
 Fedosov A., Puillandre N., Herrmann M., Kantor Yu., Oliverio M., Dgebuadze P., Modica M.V. & Bouchet P. (2018). The collapse of Mitra: molecular systematics and morphology of the Mitridae (Gastropoda: Neogastropoda). Zoological Journal of the Linnean Society. 183(2): 253-337

Mitridae
Gastropods described in 2014